Arthur William "Mick" Roper (20 February 1917 – 4 September 1972) was an Australian cricketer. He played eleven first-class matches for New South Wales in 1939–40. Roper was a fighter pilot in No. 455 Squadron RAAF stationed in Scotland.

See also
 List of New South Wales representative cricketers

References

External links

 

1917 births
1972 deaths
Australian cricketers
New South Wales cricketers
Cricketers from Sydney
Australian Services cricketers
Royal Australian Air Force personnel of World War II
Royal Australian Air Force officers
Australian World War II pilots